"The Day We Felt Distance" is the first digital single by South Korean singer and actor Kyuhyun, a member from boy band Super Junior. It was released on November 3, 2015, by S.M. Entertainment.

Composition
The song uses Bach's "Aria in G Minor" as a classical introduction, and is a ballad song that combines Kyuhyun's voice with a string orchestra.
The song describes the departure of a couple's commitment towards each other. They were once lovers who had strong emotions and feelings towards one another, however after a long-term relationship they realises that the love they have for each other is no longer there, thus their relationship breaks apart. Through the emotional lyrics and instrumental, Kyuhyun aims to portray love in a sorrowful way. Colour contrast was also seen throughout the entire music video of "The Day We Felt The Distance" to express the change in feelings the lovers have for each other.

Promotion
"The Day We Felt Distance" was released at midnight on 3 November 2015.

Solo concert
Kyuhyun's solo concert was held at the SMTOWN COEX Artium SMTOWN Theatre from November 6–8 and November 13–15, for a total of six shows. The tickets went on sale on October 1, 2015 (20:00KST) and was sold out within 46 seconds.

Track listing

Chart performance

References

External links
 Kyuhyun's official website

2016 singles
SM Entertainment singles
Cho Kyuhyun songs
2016 songs